Sharani may refer to:
 Sharani, Bulgaria
 Sharani, Iran
 Shaʿrānī, a 16th-century scholar and mystic